Christian da Silva Fiel (born 14 Jun 1989), known as just Christian, is a Brazilian professional footballer who plays as a midfielder for Azeri club Sabah.

Career

Brazil
Christian started his career at Brazil, where he played for Tuna Luso, Time Negra, Goiatuba, Evangélica, Castanhal and Grêmio Anápolis. When he was 18 years old, he was scouted and trialled at Sport Club Internacional, but when he turned 19, they thought he was too old for improvement. During his time in Evangélica, he played for free in order to attract interest from bigger teams. His football skills impressed the technical director of Grêmio Anápolis, Marco Aurelio and Teixeira and offered him a place in their squad in 2012, but his move was delayed for one year due to an injury problem. Being a player of Grêmio Anápolis he attracted interest from nine European clubs, but only APOEL made an offer for him, when he impressed Portuguese manager, Paulo Sérgio Bento Brito.

APOEL
On 20 June 2013, he moved abroad for the first time and joined Cypriot side APOEL, on a season-long loan deal from Grêmio Anápolis. He made his APOEL debut against NK Maribor at GSP Stadium on 31 July 2013, in a 1–1 first leg draw for the third qualifying round of the 2013–14 UEFA Champions League. His first career title came on 17 August 2013, after APOEL beat Apollon Limassol 1–0 at GSP Stadium to win the 2013 Cypriot Super Cup, with Christian playing the whole game in a left back position. During his six-month spell at APOEL, Christian also appeared in four league matches, one Cup match, two Champions League qualifying matches, two Europa League qualifying matches and three UEFA Europa League group stage matches, without scoring any goal.
    
On 8 January 2014, APOEL terminated Christian's contract with the club by mutual consent, and after only six months in Cyprus he returned to Brazilian side Grêmio Anápolis.

CFR Cluj
In July 2014, Christian signed a one-year contract with Romanian side CFR Cluj. After six months, in January 2015, he was loaned by CFR Cluj to C.D. Nacional in Portugal.

Paços de Ferreira
On 8 July 2015, after his contract with CFR Cluj expired, Christina signed a four-year deal with Paços de Ferreira.

Sabah
On 3 February 2022, Sabah announced the signing of Christian to an 18-month contract.

Honours
APOEL
Cypriot Super Cup: 2013
Paços Ferreira
LigaPro: 2018–19

References

External links

APOEL official profile

1989 births
Living people
Brazilian footballers
Tuna Luso Brasileira players
APOEL FC players
CFR Cluj players
C.D. Nacional players
F.C. Paços de Ferreira players
C.D. Feirense players
Casa Pia A.C. players
Associação Académica de Coimbra – O.A.F. players
Liga I players
Cypriot First Division players
Primeira Liga players
Liga Portugal 2 players
Brazilian expatriate footballers
Brazilian expatriate sportspeople in Cyprus
Expatriate footballers in Cyprus
Brazilian expatriate sportspeople in Romania
Expatriate footballers in Romania
Brazilian expatriate sportspeople in Portugal
Expatriate footballers in Portugal
Association football midfielders